Ozarelix (developmental code names D-63153, SPI-153) is a peptide gonadotropin-releasing hormone antagonist (GnRH antagonist) which is or was under development by AEterna Zentaris Inc. and Spectrum Pharmaceuticals as a long-acting injection formulation for the treatment of prostate cancer. It has also been investigated for the treatment of endometriosis, but no development has been reported. The drug was previously under investigation for the treatment of benign prostatic hyperplasia and Alzheimer's disease as well, but development for these indications was discontinued. As of June 2015, it was in phase II clinical trials for prostate cancer. It seems to no longer be under development.

See also
 Gonadotropin-releasing hormone receptor § Antagonists

References

External links
 Ozarelix - AdisInsight

Abandoned drugs
GnRH antagonists
Hormonal antineoplastic drugs
Peptides